Touch football may refer to:

Australian rules football 

 Several variations of Australian rules football are known as touch football
 Rec footy was a non-contact version of Australian rules football, played from 2003 until 2016

Gridiron football 

 Flag football, a non-contact, flag pulling, version of American and Canadian football
 Touch football (American), a variant of American football where players touch rather than tackle opponents

Rugby 

 Touch (sport), a variant of rugby league football in which players touch rather than tackle opponents
 Federation of International Touch, the worldwide governing body for Touch Football 
 National Touch League, the primary Australian national touch competition since 1997
 Touch Football Australia, the national governing body of Touch football in Australia
 Tag rugby, non-contact, flag pulling, versions of rugby 
 Touch rugby, other games derived from rugby football in which players touch rather than tackle opponents

See also
 List of types of football